The Festival Oude Muziek Utrecht ("Utrecht Early Music Festival") is an annual music festival that showcases and celebrates early European art music. The ten-day festival takes place in the Dutch city of Utrecht, and begins in August. The programme includes concerts, activities, lectures, exhibitions, and a symposium.

The primary venue is TivoliVredenburg, which opened in 2014. TivoliVredenburg is on the former site of an earlier music venue, Muziekcentrum Vredenburg. The Muziekcentrum was the festival's primary venue until it was demolished in 2008, to allow for new construction. The main concert hall of the Muziekcentrum was subsumed into the TivoliVredenburg.

Each year, the festival's organisers adopt a theme, which focuses on a particular place, time, and style in early music. The theme shapes not only the style and musical repertoire of the performances, but also the period instruments used.

See also
 Early music revival
 Historically informed performance

References

External links
 

Music festivals established in 1982 
Early music festivals
Classical music festivals in the Netherlands
Music festivals in the Netherlands
1982 establishments in the Netherlands